The CIF Los Angeles City Section (CIF-LA) is the governing body of high school athletics for public schools in the city of Los Angeles and some surrounding communities.  All of these schools were once associated with the Los Angeles Unified School District. It is one of ten sections that constitute the California Interscholastic Federation (CIF).

History
Official governance for high school sports in this area began in 1913, when the Southern California Interscholastic Athletic Council (SCIAC) was formed.  Previous to that, some individual leagues dated back to the 1890s. The High School Athletic Association of Southern California was formed in 1904 to create a championship in the sport of track and field, precipitating the need for administering all sports. In 1914, the name was changed to the Southern Section also releasing the acronym SCIAC which was taken locally by the Southern California Intercollegiate Athletic Conference the following year. In 1917, the CIF took over administering sports statewide and the Southern Section became a part of it. The Southern Section was a behemoth, the largest section covering the most populated southern half of the state. In 1935, the Los Angeles Unified School District split from the section, forming their own Los Angeles City Section.  Private schools within the city limits remained in the Southern Section. Since the advent of charter schools in the Los Angeles area, several high schools are no longer under the direct governance of LAUSD, but remain with the historical leagues and the Los Angeles City Section.

Sports
CIF-Los Angeles City Section sponsors the following sports:

Fall Season
 High School Football
 Cross Country (co-ed)
 Volleyball (Girls)
 Tennis (Girls)
 Water Polo (Boys)
 Golf (Girls)
 Field Hockey

Winter Season
 Basketball
 Soccer
 Water Polo (Girls)
 Wrestling

Spring Season
 Baseball
 Golf (boys)
 Softball
 Swimming & Diving (Co-ed)
 Tennis (Boys)
 Track & Field (Co-ed)
 Volleyball (Boys)

Football leagues
The following is the 2018-2022 league alignment for football.

Coastal Region

Coliseum
 Crenshaw High School
 Dorsey High School
 Fremont High School
 Hawkins High School
 Locke High School
 View Park Preparatory High School
  King Drew Magnet High School

Exposition
 Angelou Community High School
 Jefferson High School
 Manual Arts High School
 Rivera Learning Complex
 Santee Education Complex
 Washington Preparatory High School
 West Adams Preparatory High School

Marine
 Banning High School
 Carson High School
 Gardena High School
 Narbonne High School
 San Pedro High School

Metro
 Jordan High School
 Los Angeles High School
 Maywood Center for Enriched Studies
 Rancho Dominguez Preparatory School
 Roybal Learning Center
 Sotomayor Learning Academies

Western
 Fairfax High School
 Hamilton High School
 Palisades Charter High School
 University High School
 Venice High School
 Westchester Enriched Sciences Magnets
  Los Angeles Center for Enriched Studies (LACES)

Eastern Region

Central
 Belmont High School
 Bernstein High School
 Contreras Learning Complex
 Hollywood High School
 Marquez High School
 Mendez High School

Eastern
 Bell High School
 Garfield High School
 Huntington Park High School
 Legacy High School Complex
 Roosevelt High School
 South East High School
 South Gate High School

Northern
 Eagle Rock High School
 Franklin High School
 Lincoln High School
 Marshall High School
 Torres High School
 Wilson High School

Valley Region

East Valley
 Arleta High School
 César Chávez Learning Academies
 Grant High School
 Monroe High School
 North Hollywood High School
 Polytechnic High School
 Verdugo Hills High School

Valley Mission
 Canoga Park High School
 Kennedy High School
 Panorama High School
 Reseda High School
 San Fernando High School
 Sylmar High School
 Van Nuys High School

West Valley
 Birmingham High School
 Chatsworth High School
 Cleveland High School
 El Camino Real High School
 Granada Hills Charter High School
 Taft High School

References

External links
 CIF Los Angeles City Section website

Los Angeles
High school sports in California
Organizations based in Los Angeles County, California
High school sports associations in the United States
Sports governing bodies in the United States
Sports organizations established in 1935
1935 establishments in California
Sports in Los Angeles